The 1915 West Virginia Mountaineers football team was an American football team that represented West Virginia University as an independent during the 1915 college football season. In its second and final season under head coach Sol Metzger, the team compiled a 5–1–1 record and outscored opponents by a total of 208 to 19.

Schedule

References

West Virginia
West Virginia Mountaineers football seasons
West Virginia Mountaineers football